Miss Teen Ecuador is a national beauty pageant in Ecuador that began in 1966.

The pageant selects Miss Teen Ecuador, Miss Teenager Ecuador and representatives of Ecuador to international competitions.

Miss Teen Ecuador has a long history producing recognized international competitions inside and outside the country.

The contest is produced and organized by Rodrigo Moreira, who promotes the values of Ecuadorian women through an awareness-raising campaign among contestants for the benefit of children and adolescents with cancer treated at SOLCA.

History

20th century
Miss Teen Ecuador emerged as a preliminary event to select the representative of Ecuador in the International Teen Princess competition in 1966.

In 1974, Zoila Villagran Salazar of Manabí was crowned as the first Miss Teenage and represented at Miss Teenage Intercontinental.

In 1975, Yela Denise Klein moved on to the top 8 of Miss Teenage Intercontinental held in the Grand Salon, Americana Hotel, in Oranjestad, Aruba. 

In 1981, Gisella Puertas Del Barco competed in the last edition of Miss Teen Intercontinental held at the Aparta Hotel Golf in Barranquilla, Colombia.

The Miss Teen Intercontinental contest based in Aruba directed only teens were allowed to compete  was renamed Miss Intercontinental in 1982. 

The contest under the direction of Cesar Montece  changed officially its name to Miss Teen Ecuador in 1990. Alicia Álvarez representing Guayas became the first Miss Teen Ecuador winner in Guayaquil City, Ecuador. C. J. Arosemena Monroy, a former President of the Republic of Ecuador was present during the pageant coronation night.

21st century

Cesar Montece died in 2010, and his sister, Rosa, succeeded as chairwoman of the Queen of Ecuador company.

In 2012, the Queen of Ecuador Inc. company sold all the rights of the contest to Rodrigo Moreira.

The Miss Teen Ecuador pageant celebrated its 25th anniversary at the Teatro Centro de Arte on April 18, 2015.

Miss Teen Ecuador is one of the most important beauty pageants in Ecuador.

Titleholders
This is a list of women who have won the Miss Teen Ecuador beauty pageant.
  Triple winners for 25th Anniversary

This is a list of women who have won the Miss Teenager Ecuador title.

Representatives at Miss Teen Universe
This is a list of women who competed at the Miss Teen Universe beauty pageant.
Color Key

Representatives at Miss Teen World
This is a list of women who competed at the Miss Teen World beauty pageant.
Color key

Representatives at Miss Teenager Universal
This is a list of women who competed at the Miss Teenager Universal beauty pageant.
Color Key

Representatives at Miss Teenager World
This is a list of women who competed at the Miss Teenager World beauty pageant.
Color Key

Representatives at Miss Teen Earth
This is a list of women who competed at the Miss Teen Earth International beauty pageant.
Color key

Representatives at Miss Teen International
This is a list of women who competed at the Miss Teen International beauty pageant.
Color Key

1The Miss Teen International organization based in Ecuador not held any competitions due to COVID-19. Judging of the competition took place outside of the normal pageant environment due to the global restrictions on public events and international travel imposed by the Covid-19 pandemic. The winner was crowned in a live-streamed event.

Representatives at Miss Teen Intercontinental
This is a list of women who competed at the Miss Teen Intercontinental beauty pageant.
Color Key

Representatives at Miss Teen Supranational
This is a list of women who competed at the Miss Teen Supranational beauty pageant.
Color Key

Major beauty pageants
Miss Teen Ecuador winners and runners-up in the world's major beauty contests.

See also
Miss Teen Earth
Miss Teenager World

References

External links
Official page

Beauty pageants in Ecuador
Ecuadorian awards
Beauty pageants for youth
Recurring events established in 1990